A partial solar eclipse will occur on Saturday, November 16, 2058. A solar eclipse occurs when the Moon passes between Earth and the Sun, thereby totally or partly obscuring the image of the Sun for a viewer on Earth. A partial solar eclipse occurs in the polar regions of the Earth when the center of the Moon's shadow misses the Earth.

Related eclipses

Solar eclipses 2059–2061

Saros 124

References

External links 
 http://eclipse.gsfc.nasa.gov/SEplot/SEplot2051/SE2058Nov16P.GIF

2058 in science
2058 11 16
2058 11 16